Eupithecia tornolopha is a moth in the family Geometridae first described by Alfred Jefferis Turner in 1942. It is found in Australia.

References

Moths described in 1942
tornolopha
Moths of Australia